Ārjava literally means sincerity, straightness and non-hypocrisy. It is one of the ten Yamas in ancient Hindu and Jaina texts.

Definition
Ārjav means straightness, sincerity and harmony in one’s thought, words and actions towards oneself and towards others. Kane translates arjava as straightforwardness. It is explained in ancient Indian texts as “self-restraint from hypocrisy", and "the absence of hypocrisy”. It is included as one of several ethical virtuous restraints in an individual's path to spirituality. The Maharashtrian poet Vāmana in Avigita, at xvi.1, posits arjava is a form of honesty and purity in a person, and an essential virtue so that one may treat everyone equally, whether that other is one’s child, wife, relative, friend, a stranger, someone hostile or oneself without any discrimination.

The ethical concept of Arjava is synonymously referred to as Adambha (अदम्भ, composite word from अ+दम्भ). Adambha also means non-deceitful, straightforwardness and sincerity. It is listed as a virtue in the Indian Epics.

Literature
Arjava is one of the ten yamas listed by Śāṇḍilya Upanishad, as well as by Svātmārāma. It is one of the virtuous restraints (yamas) taught in ancient Indian texts. The other nine yamas are Ahiṃsā (अहिंसा): Nonviolence, Satya (सत्य): truthfulness, Asteya (अस्तेय): not stealing, Brahmacharya (ब्रह्मचर्य): celibacy and not cheating on one’s spouse, Kṣamā (क्षमा): forgiveness, Dhṛti (धृति): fortitude, Dayā (दया): compassion, Mitāhāra (मितहार): measured diet, and Śauca (शौच): purity, cleanliness.

In some texts, such as by Adi Sankara, this virtue is called as bhavasamsuddhi, and explained as purity of motive and freedom of mind from hypocrisy, both in one’s social conduct, as well as within oneself where one’s thoughts, words and actions resonate. It is considered as a virtue that empowers one to act and live without anxiety, anger, prejudice, inner conflict or confusion. It is also discussed in Bhagwad Gita in verse 17.16.

The Mahabharata, in Book 12 Chapter 60, lists Adambha (non-hypocrisy) as a virtue along with Akrodha (non-anger), Kshama (forgiveness) and others. In the same book, in Chapter 278, the Epic explains how and why hypocrisy arises, suggesting that it is a derivative of the sin of covetousness, greed and attachment to superficial possessions. Patanjali's treatise on Yoga lists only five yamas, which includes non-covetousness and non-possessiveness (Asteya and Aparigraha respectively), but does not include Arjava.

See also
Ahiṃsā
Satya
Asteya
Brahmacharya
Kṣamā
Dhṛti
Dayā
Mitahara
Śauca
Akrodha
Dāna

References

Yoga concepts
Hindu philosophical concepts
Jain ethics
Hindu ethics